The 1984–85 Edmonton Oilers season was the Oilers' sixth season in the NHL, and they were coming off a Stanley Cup championship in 1983–84.  Edmonton would win their fourth-straight Smythe Division title, and repeat as Stanley Cup champions. On June 5, 2017, this team was voted by fans as the greatest NHL team ever, as part of the NHL's centennial celebrations.

Regular season
The Oilers once again scored over 400 goals in a season. The Oilers also let in 298 goals, their fewest since the 1981–82 season. The Oilers started the season with an NHL record 15-game unbeaten streak (12–0–3).

Wayne Gretzky earned 208 points, breaking the 200 point mark for the third time in his career, and win his fifth straight Art Ross Trophy, and his sixth consecutive Hart Trophy. Jari Kurri scored a career-high 71 goals and 135 points, and win the Lady Byng Trophy.  Paul Coffey had 121 points (37 goals-84 assists) en route to the first Norris Trophy of his career. On December 26, 1984, Coffey was the last defenceman in the 20th Century to score four goals in one game. It occurred in a game versus the Calgary Flames.

In goal, Grant Fuhr and Andy Moog split time, with Fuhr leading the Oilers in wins with 26, while Moog led the team with a 3.30 GAA.

Season standings

Schedule and results

Playoffs
In the playoffs, the Oilers swept past the Los Angeles Kings and the Winnipeg Jets in the first 2 rounds. Edmonton ran into a bit of a problem with the Chicago Black Hawks in the Conference Finals, as the teams split the first 4 games, with each team winning two at home, however, the Oilers won the next 2 games and advance to their 3rd straight Stanley Cup Final. After losing the opening game of the Stanley Cup Finals against the Philadelphia Flyers, the Oilers stepped up their play and won the next 4 games to win their 2nd straight Stanley Cup.  Wayne Gretzky won the Conn Smythe Trophy for the first time in his career, as he scored an NHL record 47 points (17G-30A) in the playoffs.

Player statistics

Regular season
Scoring leaders

Goaltending

Playoffs
Scoring leaders

Goaltending

Awards and Records

Awards

Records
 205: An Oilers record for most penalty minutes in a single season by Kevin McClelland.
197: A new Oilers record for most penalty minutes in a single season by Kevin McClelland on March 31, 1985.
 135: An NHL record for most assists in a single season by Wayne Gretzky.
126: A new NHL record for most assists in a single season by Wayne Gretzky on March 29, 1985.
 47: An NHL record for most points in a playoffs by Wayne Gretzky.
39: A new NHL record for most points in a playoffs by Wayne Gretzky on May 25, 1985.
 30: An NHL record for most assists in a playoffs by Wayne Gretzky.
27: A new NHL record for most assists in a playoffs by Wayne Gretzky on May 25, 1985.
 19: Tied NHL record for most goals in a single playoffs by Jari Kurri on May 30, 1985.

Milestones

Transactions

Trades

Free agents

Draft picks
Edmonton's draft picks at the 1984 NHL Entry Draft.

References

 National Hockey League Guide & Record Book 2007

Edmonton Oilers season, 1984-85
Edmonton Oilers season, 1984-85
Edmon
Edmonton Oilers seasons
Smythe Division champion seasons
Stanley Cup championship seasons
Western Conference (NHL) championship seasons